The 2013 Yale Bulldogs football team represented Yale University in the 2013 NCAA Division I FCS football season. They were led by second-year head coach Tony Reno and played their home games at the Yale Bowl. They were a member of the Ivy League. The finished with a record with of 5–5 overall and 3–4 in Ivy League play for a three-way tie for fourth place. Yale averaged 19,809 fans per game.

Schedule

References

Yale
Yale Bulldogs football seasons
Yale Bulldogs football